The Randecker Maar is a maar – a volcanic crater about  wide.  It is in the Swabian Jura mountains, in the municipality Bissingen an der Teck near Stuttgart and was formed around 17 million years ago.  A lake formed in the crater and its bed is now a layer of the early Miocene in which many fossils have been found.  Nowadays, the crater is drained by the Zipfelbach brook and so there is no longer a lake.

The northeastern wall of the crater has eroded and opens to lower ground.  This forms a natural pass for the seasonal migration of birds and insects as they fly up and over the alps.  This makes it a good point for observing these creatures and so an observatory was established there in 1969 by ornithologist Wulf Gatter – Forschungsstation Randecker Maar e.V..

The maar and gorge of the Zipfelbach were designated as a nature reserve by local ordinances in 1971 and 1990 to preserve the landscape and its fauna and flora for science and popular enjoyment.  The area conserved is now .

References

Further reading
 
 
 

Maars
Volcanoes of Germany
Miocene volcanoes
Geography of Baden-Württemberg